Te Waari Kahukura Whaitiri  (11 September 1912 – 26 November 1996) was a notable New Zealand master mariner and community worker. Of Māori descent, he identified with the Ngāi Tahu and Ngāti Mutunga iwi. He was born in Kairakau, Chatham Islands, New Zealand, in 1912.

In the 1990 New Year Honours, Whaitiri was awarded the Queen's Service Medal for community service.

References

1912 births
1996 deaths
Ngāi Tahu people
Ngāti Mutunga people
New Zealand sailors
People from the Chatham Islands
Recipients of the Queen's Service Medal